The Muzzle is a 1938 German comedy film directed by Erich Engel and starring Ralph Arthur Roberts, Hilde Weissner and Charlotte Schellhorn. It was remade in 1958.

The film's art direction was by Robert Herlth.

Cast 
 Ralph Arthur Roberts as Prosecutor Herbert von Traskow
 Hilde Weissner as Elisabeth von Traskow
 Charlotte Schellhorn as Trude von Traskow
 Will Quadflieg as Rabanus, painter
 Renée Stobrawa as Billa, maid
 Theodor Loos as Senior Prosecutor
 Paul Henckels as Wimm
 Ludwig Schmitz as Bätes
 Elisabeth Flickenschildt as the lady at the interrogation
 Werner Pledath as dentist
 Hermann Pfeiffer as Mühsaam, detective inspector
 Maria Krahn as Mrs. Tigges
 Gerd Høst as nude model
 Otto Matthies as Thürnagel, trainee lawyer
 Walter Bluhm as Little Match
 Werner Scharf as Ali, painter
 Hugo Werner-Kahle as chairman of the court hearing
 Erich Ziegel as Councilor of Justice
 Adolf Fischer as Schibulski, detective
 Aribert Grimmer as a police officer
 Leonie Duval as owner of the leather goods store
 Valeska Stock as Schmitz` wife
 Hans Meyer-Hanno as police officer
 Werner Funck as a public prosecutor
 Maria Hofen
 Renate Howe as an apprentice
 Karl Junge-Swinburne as a public prosecutor
 Max Wilmsen as dog owner
 Georg A. Profé as artist, guest at the studio party
 Fanny Cotta as guest at the studio party
 Georg Georgi as banker
 Rudolf Fenner as Prosecutor's secretary
 Bernhard Gronau as Meyer, detective
 Kurt Meister as the fifth regular visitor
 Kurt Getke as a detective
 Charly Berger as a police officer
 Walter Ruesta as a newspaper seller
 Otto Lange
 Erich Schuster
 Alfred Haase

References

Bibliography

External links 
 

1938 films
1930s historical comedy films
1930s German-language films
Films based on works by Heinrich Spoerl
Films directed by Erich Engel
Films set in the 1890s
Tobis Film films
German black-and-white films
German historical comedy films
1938 comedy films
1930s German films